Nilam Devi Bhumiharani or Nilam Devi Bhumiharin is a Nepalese politician who is elected member of Provincial Assembly of Madhesh Province from Loktantrik Samajbadi Party, Nepal. Shah is a resident of Balara, Nepal.

References

External links

Living people
Members of the Provincial Assembly of Madhesh Province
People from Sarlahi District
21st-century Nepalese women politicians
21st-century Nepalese politicians
Loktantrik Samajwadi Party, Nepal politicians
1954 births